Malik Omar Allen (born June 27, 1978) is an American former professional basketball player, currently serving as an assistant coach for the Miami Heat of the National Basketball Association (NBA).

Professional career 
After four years at Villanova University Allen went undrafted in the 2000 NBA draft. He began his career in the ABA with the San Diego Wildfire and in the International Basketball League with Trenton in 2000–01 season. On July 20, 2001 he was signed by the Miami Heat of the NBA. He stayed with the Heat until he was traded on February 24, 2005 to the Charlotte Bobcats. The Chicago Bulls signed him to a two-year deal on September 2, 2005. Over two seasons with the Bulls Allen played in 114 regular season games making 21 starts and averaged 4.5 points and 2.3 rebounds per game. On September 10, 2007, the New Jersey Nets signed Allen to a one-year contract worth US$964,636.

Allen appeared in 21 NBA Playoff games. He started all six playoff games for Chicago during '06 playoffs.

On February 19, 2008, he was traded to the Dallas Mavericks along with Jason Kidd and Antoine Wright in exchange for Keith Van Horn, Devin Harris, Trenton Hassell, DeSagana Diop, Maurice Ager, $3 million cash and 2008 and the Mavericks' 2010 first round draft pick.

On July 17, 2008, he, along with Tyronn Lue of the Dallas Mavericks, signed a contract with the Milwaukee Bucks.

On July 22, 2009, the Denver Post reported that he was set to be traded to the Denver Nuggets in exchange for Sonny Weems and Walter Sharpe. The trade was made official on July 31, 2009.

On September 16, 2010, the Orlando Sentinel reported that Allen was signed to an undisclosed deal.

Allen's final NBA game ever was Game 5 of the 2011 Eastern Conference First Round on April 26th, 2011 in a 101 - 76 win over the Atlanta Hawks. In his final game, Allen recorded 1 point and 1 rebound. Orlando would go on to lose Game 6 and get eliminated from the playoffs 4 - 2.

Coaching career
On August 7, 2014, it was announced that Allen was named an assistant coach for the Detroit Pistons. After a season with the Timberwolves, Allen accepted a position to return to the Miami Heat as an assistant coach.

NBA career statistics

Regular season 

|-
| align="left" | 
| align="left" | Miami
| 12 || 2 || 13.4 || .431 || .000 || .800 || 3.2 || .4 || .2 || .7 || 4.3
|-
| align="left" | 
| align="left" | Miami
| 80 || 73 || 29.0 || .424 || .000 || .802 || 5.3 || .7 || .5 || 1.0 || 9.6
|-
| align="left" | 
| align="left" | Miami
| 45 || 6 || 13.7 || .419 || .000 || .758 || 2.6 || .4 || .3 || .6 || 4.2
|-
| align="left" | 
| align="left" | Miami
| 14 || 0 || 17.7 || .461 || .000 || .929 || 3.7 || .8 || .3 || .8 || 5.9
|-
| align="left" | 
| align="left" | Charlotte
| 22 || 1 || 12.3 || .485 || .000 || .929 || 2.1 || .3 || .2 || .5 || 5.0
|-
| align="left" | 
| align="left" | Chicago
| 54 || 20 || 13.0 || .490 || 1.000 || .605 || 2.6 || .4 || .3 || .3 || 4.9
|-
| align="left" | 
| align="left" | Chicago
| 60 || 1 || 10.6 || .415 || .000 || .824 || 2.0 || .3 || .3 || .3 || 4.0
|-
| align="left" | 
| align="left" | New Jersey
| 48 || 12 || 15.9 || .475 || .500 || .923 || 2.7 || .6 || .3 || .4 || 5.4
|-
| align="left" | 
| align="left" | Dallas
| 25 || 4 || 13.3 || .500 || .000 || .917 || 2.7 || .6 || .2 || .4 || 3.1
|-
| align="left" | 
| align="left" | Milwaukee
| 49 || 3 || 11.8 || .429 || .000 || .476 || 2.1 || .7 || .1 || .2 || 3.2
|-
| align="left" | 
| align="left" | Denver
| 51 || 3 || 8.9 || .397 || .167 || .923 || 1.6 || .3 || .2 || .1 || 2.1
|-
| align="left" | 
| align="left" | Orlando
| 18 || 0 || 9.9 || .355 || .000 || .500 || 1.8 || .2 || .1 || .2 || 1.3
|-
|-class="sortbottom"
| style="text-align:center;" colspan="2"| Career 
| 478 || 125 || 15.2 || .439 || .188 || .778 || 2.8 || .5 || .3 || .5 || 4.9

Playoffs 

|-
| align="left" | 2004
| align="left" | Miami
| 10 || 0 || 13.8 || .449 || .000 || .667 || 3.0 || .4 || .2 || .9 || 5.0
|-
| align="left" | 2006
| align="left" | Chicago
| 6 || 6 || 19.3 || .467 || .000 || .000 || 3.0 || 1.2 || .3 || 1.0 || 4.7
|-
| align="left" | 2007
| align="left" | Chicago
| 5 || 0 || 6.8 || .167 || .000 || .000 || 1.4 || .2 || .2 || .2 || .8
|-
| align="left" | 2008
| align="left" | Dallas
| 3 || 0 || 6.0 || .000 || .000 || .000 || .0 || .0 || .0 || .0 || .0
|-
| align="left" | 2010
| align="left" | Denver
| 4 || 0 || 2.8 || .000 || .000 || .000 || .8 || .0 || .2 || .0 || .0
|-
|-class="sortbottom"
| style="text-align:center;" colspan="2"| Career 
| 28 || 6 || 11.3 || .409 || .000 || .600 || 2.1 || .4 || .2 || .6 || 2.9

References

External links
NBA biography
Villanova Wildcats bio

1978 births
Living people
American men's basketball players
Basketball coaches from New Jersey
Basketball players from New Jersey
Charlotte Bobcats players
Chicago Bulls players
Dallas Mavericks players
Denver Nuggets players
Detroit Pistons assistant coaches
Miami Heat players
Milwaukee Bucks players
New Jersey Nets players
Orlando Magic players
Parade High School All-Americans (boys' basketball)
People from Willingboro Township, New Jersey
Power forwards (basketball)
San Diego Wildfire players
Shawnee High School (New Jersey) alumni
Sportspeople from Burlington County, New Jersey
Undrafted National Basketball Association players
Villanova Wildcats men's basketball players